The International is a 2006 Turkish comedy-drama film, directed by Muharrem Gülmez and Sırrı Süreyya Önder, about a group of local musicians preparing to play at a large military parade in a small town near Adana, Turkey. It was also entered into the 29th Moscow International Film Festival.

Plot
In 1982 a small town near Adana prepares to host a large military parade. A group of local musicians are to perform at the event. Gülendam, the daughter of Abuzer, one of the musicians is getting ready for university. Her boyfriend Haydar who is a left wing activist and his friends hatch plot to replace the track to be played with The Internationale.

Cast
Cezmi Baskın as Abuzer Yayladalı
Özgü Namal as Gülendam
Umut Kurt as Haydar Arıkan
Bahri Beyat as Mahmut Yayladalı
Meral Okay as Ayderya Derya
Nazmi Kirik as Tekin Yayladalı
Oktay Kaynarca as Major - Commander of The Major Law in the town
Dilber Ay as Arzum Çilem

Awards
The film won the following awards: 

14th Altın Koza International Film Festival: Best Film, Best Film (audience award), Best Screenplay (Sırrı Süreyya Önder), Best Actor (Cezmi Baskın), Best Supporting Actress (Meral Okay & Dilber Ay), Best Cinematography (Gökhan Atılmış)
18th Ankara Film Festival: Best Film, Onat Kutlar Best Screenplay Award (Sırrı Süreyya Önder)
Barcelona International Political Films Festival: Audience Award, Jury Special Award
26th Istanbul Film Festival: Best Actress (Özgü Namal)
Pune International Film Festival: Best Actor (Cezmi Baskın)

References

External links

2006 films
2000s Turkish-language films
2000s political comedy-drama films
Films set in Turkey
Turkish political films
Best Picture Golden Boll Award winners
2006 comedy films
2006 drama films